Máo Zétán (毛泽覃, also named Máo Zélín 毛泽淋, courtesy name first Yǒngjú 咏菊, then Rùnjú 润菊; 25 September 1905 – 25 April 1935) was the younger brother of Mao Zedong. He joined the Chinese Communist Party in 1923. In 1927, he participated in the Nanchang Uprising, retreating with the Communists to the Jinggang Mountains at its completion. At the age of 29, he was captured and executed while fighting Kuomintang forces in Jiangxi, covering the withdrawal of the main Communist army during the Long March.

See also 
 Mao Zedong
 Mao Zemin
 Mao Zejian
 Yang Kaihui
 Mao Anying

1905 births
1935 deaths
Chinese communists
Mao Zedong family
People from Xiangtan